Carlos Rolando Valdez (born 22 May 1945) is a Guatemalan footballer. He competed in the men's tournament at the 1968 Summer Olympics.

References

External links
 

1945 births
Living people
Guatemalan footballers
Guatemala international footballers
Olympic footballers of Guatemala
Footballers at the 1968 Summer Olympics
Sportspeople from Guatemala City
Association football midfielders